The Kandy Esala Perahera (the Sri Dalada Perahara procession of Kandy) also known as The Festival of the Tooth is a festival held in July and August in Kandy, Sri Lanka. This historical procession is held annually to pay homage to the Sacred Tooth Relic of Buddha, which is housed at the Sri Dalada Maligawa in Kandy. A unique symbol of Sri Lanka, the procession consists of traditional local dances such as fire dances and performances in whip-dance garments. The festival ends with the traditional Diya-kepeema ritual, a water cutting ceremony which is held at the Mahaweli River at Getambe, Kandy.

History

The Esala is believed to be a fusion of two separate but interconnected "Peraheras" (Processions) – The Esala and Dalada. The Esala Perahera, which is thought to date back to the 3rd century BC, was a ritual enacted to request the gods for rainfall. The Dalada Perahera is believed to have begun when the Sacred Tooth Relic of Lord Buddha was brought to Sri Lanka from India during the 4th century CE, eight hundred years after the passing away of the Buddha.

According to tradition, the Tooth Relic was taken in procession to Sri Lanka by Princess Hemamala & Prince Dantha.

It was also through the efforts of Upali Thera that the Kandy Esala Perahera came into being. This procession was originally focused on honour Brahminical deities, particularly those incorporated into Sri Lankan Buddhism. Upali Thera believed this to be inappropriate in a Buddhist nation, and his influence led to the king declaring that "Henceforth gods and men are to follow the Buddha".

Modern Perahera
After the Kandyan Kingdom fell to the British in 1815, the custody of the Relic was handed over to the Maha Sangha (the Buddhist Clergy). In the absence of the king, a chief lay custodian called the "Diyawadana Nilame" was appointed to handle routine administrative matters concerning the relic and its care.

The Procession
The Kandy Esala Perahera begins with the Kap Situveema or Kappa, in which a sanctified young Jackfruit tree (Artocarpus integrifolia) is cut and planted on the premises of each of the four Devales dedicated to the four guardian gods Natha, Vishnu, Katharagama and the goddess Pattini. Traditionally it was meant to shower blessing on the King and the people.

The Kumbal Perahera

For the next five nights, the "Devale Peraheras" take place within the premises of the four Devales with the priest of each Devale taking the pole every evening, accompanied by music and drumming, flag and canopy bearers, spearman and the Ran Ayudha (gold Armaments), the sacred insignia of the Gods.

On the sixth night, the Kumbal Perahera begins and continues on for five days. Initially, the Devale Peraheras assemble in front of the Temple of the Tooth, which is Sri Lanka's most important Buddhist Shrine and where the Buddha's Sacred Tooth Relic has been kept since the 16th century, with their insignias placed on the ransivige (a dome-like structure) accompanied by the Basnayake Nilames (the lay custodians of the Devales).

The relic casket, which is a replica of the Tooth Relic, is placed inside the ransivige affixed to the Maligawa Elephant,   the Maligawa Perahera joins the awaiting Devale Peraheras and leads the procession. Whip-crackers and fireball acrobats clear the path, followed by the Buddhist flag bearers. Then, riding on the first elephant is the official called Peramuna Rala (Front Official). He is followed by Kandyan Drummers and Dancers who enthral the crowd, and are themselves followed by elephants and other groups of musicians, dancers and flag bearers. A group of singers dressed in white heralds the arrival of the Maligawa Tusker carrying the Sacred Tooth Relic. The Diyawadana Nilame (traditionally required to do everything in his power to ensure rain in the correct season) walks in traditional Kandyan-clothed splendour after the tusker.

The second procession is from the Natha Devale, which faces the Sri Dalada Maligawa and is said to be the oldest building in Kandy, dating back to the 14th century.

The third is from the Vishnu Devale (Vishnu being a Hindu god), also known as the Maha Devale. It is situated in front of the main gate of the Natha Devale.

The fourth procession is from the Katharagama Devale (dedicated to the God of Kataragama deviyo, identified with the warrior god Skanda) which is on Kottugodalle Vidiya (a street in Kandy). This procession includes Kavadi, the peacock dance, in which the pilgrim dances carry semicircular wooden contraptions studded with peacock feathers on their shoulders.

The fifth and final procession is from the Pattini Devale (Pattini being a goddess associated with the cure of infectious diseases and called upon in times of drought and famine), which is situated to the West of the Natha Devale. This is the only procession that has women dances.

The following important times are announced by the firing of cannonballs, which can be heard all across Kandy.
The commencement of the Devale Peraheras
The placing of the casket on the tusker back
The commencement of the Dalada Perahera
The completion of the Perahera

The Randoli Perahera

The Randoli Perahera begins after five nights of the Kumbal Perahera. Randoli refers to palanquins on which the Queens of the ruling Kings traditionally travelled. 
2018 Kandy Esala Maha Perahera (Randoli Perahera) was held on 25 August 2018, the full moon poya day with the participation of hundreds thousands of people.

Diya Kepeema and the Day Perahera

After a further five nights of the Randoli Perahera, the pageant ends with the Diya Kepeema, which is the water cutting ceremony at the Mahaweli River at Getambe, a town a few miles from Kandy. A Day Perahera is held to mark the ceremony.

Organization of the Perahera

The rituals connected with the Tooth Relic are conducted by Monks of the Malwatte Chapter and Asgiriya Chapters of the Buddhist clergy in Sri Lanka. It is the duty of the Diyawadana Nilame to organize the Perahera and thus he summons a large number of officials of the Temple of the Tooth and entrusts them with various ceremonial duties connected with the conducting of the Perahera. He first gets the auspicious time from the Nekath Mohottala, the advisor on astrological matters. The task of organising the different types of drummers is handed over to the four officials known as the Panikka Mura Baarakaruwo.

The Maligawa officials also meet the owners of the elephants due to take part in the Perahera (most elephants are privately owned). The dance troupes are given time to prepare. The Basnayake Nilames (the lay custodians of the Devales) are then told to organise their processions.

Perahera Sandeshaya

On completion of the Perahera, the Diyawadana Nilame would lead a procession consisting of the Nilames of Sathara Maha Devalas and the Nilames of rural devalas to the President's Pavilion carrying a sannasa (formal letter) known as the Perahera Sandeshaya to the President stating the successful completion of the annual Esala Perahera. The President would meet and receive the sannasa at the entrance to the President's Pavilion.

Notable Sacred Casket Bearer Tuskers
The following are some of the notable tusker elephants who participated as the main casket bearer of the Kandy Esala perehera festival.
Raja (රාජා හස්තියා)
Heiyantuduwa Raja (හෙයියන්තුඩුවේ රාජා)
Millangoda Raja (මිල්ලන්ගොඩ රාජා )
Nadungamuwa Raja (නැදුම්ගමුවේ රාජා)
Some other tusker elephants participated as the main casket bearer of the Kandy Esala perehera festival from time to time.

 Saman Dewalaye Raja / Vijayadantha (සමන් රාජා / විජයදන්ත)
 Vaavaladeniye Raja (වෑවලදෙනියේ රාජා)
 Gangaramaye nawam Raja /Ruwan Raja (ගංගාරාමයේ නවම් රාජා)
 Bellanvila Raja (බෙල්ලන්විල රාජා)
 Jaya Raja (ජය රාජා)
 Katharagama Vasana (කතරගම වාසනා)
 Indi raja ( ඉන්දි රාජා)

tusker elephants who participated as the main casket bearer of the Kandy Esala perehera festival in deep history.

 Eirawana(ඵෙරාවණ)   -KIng 5 Kithsiri Mewan era  
 Lewke valavve Atha (ලෙව්කේ වළව්වේ ඇතා)
 Mathalee Vaagodapala valavve Atta (මාතලේ වෑගොඩපොළ වලව්වේ ඇතා)
 Paanabokka valavve Atha/Dala Kota (පානබොක්කෙ වළව්වේ ඇතා/ දළ කොටා)
 Mahayyiyawa ratvatte valavve Gomara Atha (මහයියාවේ රත්වත්තේ වලව්වේ ගෝමර ඇතා)
 Idampitiye Atha (ඉඩම්පිටියේ ඇතා)

See also 
Diyawadana Nilame, Sri Dalada Maligawa, Kandy
Cetiya
Relics associated with Buddha

References

Buddhist festivals in Sri Lanka
Kandy
Tourist attractions in Central Province, Sri Lanka
Annual events in Kandy